The Bergen County Scholastic League (BCSL)  was a New Jersey high school sports association under the jurisdiction of the New Jersey State Interscholastic Athletic Association (NJSIAA). The conference consisted of thirty public and parochials high schools covering Bergen County and Hudson County in northern New Jersey. These schools were grouped into three divisions, according to the state classification given by the NJSIAA. The three divisions were the American, mostly made up of Group II schools, and National and Olympic, which were mostly made up of Group I schools. After a decision by the NJSIAA in February 2008, Hawthorne Christian Academy and Saddle River Day School were added into the BCSL Olympic Division starting as of September 2008.

Beginning in the 2010-2011 school year, the American Division was annexed into the newly created Big North Conference, while the National and Olympic Divisions were annexed into the new North Jersey Interscholastic Conference.

Sports 
Fall Sports: Cross Country*, Football, Girls' Tennis, Soccer*, Volleyball
Winter Sports: Basketball*, Swimming*, Track & Field*, Wrestling, Bowling*
Spring Sports: Baseball, Boys' Tennis, Golf*, Softball, Track & Field*

(*)Sports offered to both boys and girls.

BCSL American

BCSL National

BCSL Olympic

References

External links 
Bergen County Scholastic League website
New Jersey State Interscholastic Athletic Association

Education in Bergen County, New Jersey
Sports in Hudson County, New Jersey
New Jersey high school athletic conferences
Sports in Bergen County, New Jersey